Mecyclothorax goweri is a species of ground beetle in the subfamily Psydrinae. It was described by Barry P. Moore in 1992.

References

goweri
Beetles described in 1992